Nicholas Bevan "Nick" Ephgrave  is a senior British police officer. He is currently Assistant Commissioner of the Metropolitan Police Service. He was Senior Investigating Officer on the re-investigation of Damilola Taylor's murder.

Early life and education
Ephgrave was born in Surrey, England. His first career was as a physicist in the National Health Service (NHS).

Policing career
He first became an officer in the Metropolitan Police Service, rising to Commander of Lambeth Borough before becoming Chief Constable of Surrey Police (2016-2018). He then returned to the Metropolitan Police as Assistant Commissioner for Met Operations. In June 2016 received the Queen's Police Medal. He also heads the National Police Chiefs' Council's Coordination Committee on Criminal Justice and is due to leave the Metropolitan Police to take up a new temporary post with the Council later in 2022.

Honours

References

Year of birth missing (living people)
Living people
British Chief Constables
Assistant Commissioners of Police of the Metropolis
20th-century births
English recipients of the Queen's Police Medal
Metropolitan Police recipients of the Queen's Police Medal